The following is a list of events, births, and deaths in 1851 in Switzerland.

Incumbents
Federal Council:
Ulrich Ochsenbein 
Jonas Furrer 
Josef Munzinger (President)
Henri Druey 
Friedrich Frey-Herosé
Wilhelm Matthias Naeff 
Stefano Franscini

Events 
 Patek Philippe & Co. is founded
 Swiss Federal Council first considers official representation in the Philippines
 The Eidgenössischer Stutzer 1851, the first service rifle used by the Swiss armed forces to be procured by the federal government, goes into service
 The telegraph is organized in Switzerland
 All Swiss weights and measures are unified

Births 
 October 6 - Wilhelm Oechsli, historian (d. 1919)

Deaths 
 Abraham Constantin, enamel painter (b. 1785)

References 

 
Years of the 19th century in Switzerland